Riga Technical University Open (also RTU Open) is international "open" chess festival, annually held in Riga, Latvia in August. It is the largest classical chess tournament in the Baltic states.

Abstract 
The Riga Technical University Open is held since 2011, with the exception of the year 2020 due to global pandemic, subsequently the 10th jubilee edition followed in summer 2021. This International Chess Festival is organized by Riga Technical University in cooperation with Latvian Chess Federation and Riga Chess Federation. Founder and Tournament Director is IO Egons Lavendelis from Latvia, as a player he is also FM. Chief Arbiter of the RTU Festival is IA Alberts Cimiņš, Chief Arbiter of the Tournament A is IA Andra Cimiņa. Current venue is the Ķīpsala exhibition hall in Riga, the capital of Latvia.

The RTU Open has attracted thousands of chess players from over 50 countries in these years, becoming one of the biggest chess Festivals in northern Europe and in the whole continent. Additional events as GM lectures, excursions, simuls, as well as Bughouse (tandem) and Dice Chess are offered, too.

History 
The first three international chess festivals (2011–2013) was held in the main building of the Riga Technical University. The first and second festival included two classical chess tournaments (A for masters and B for amateurs) and a last day blitz tournament. The third festival included three classical chess tournaments (A for masters and B-C for amateurs). 
The fourth international chess festival in 2014 moved the International Exhibition Centre Ķīpsala where was applied to a larger number of participants. The fourth international chess festival included five classical chess tournaments (A for masters and B–E for amateurs) and a first day blitz tournament. The fifth and sixth festival was held in Ķīpsala and included four classical chess tournaments (A for masters and B–D for amateurs) and a last day blitz tournament. Overall more than 1200 participants took part in the festivals from the years 2014 to 2016. The seventh festival in 2017 was held in Ķīpsala and included five classical chess tournaments (A for masters and B–E for amateurs) and a last day blitz tournament. The eighth festival in 2018 was held in Ķīpsala and included five classical chess tournaments (A for masters and B–E for amateurs) and two blitz tournaments. The ninth festival in 2019 was held in Ķīpsala and included six classical chess tournaments (A for masters, Y for young chess players and B–E for amateurs), rapid chess tournament and two blitz tournaments. In 2020, the tournament did not take place due to a COVID-19 pandemic. The tenth festival in 2021 was held in Ķīpsala and included four classical chess tournaments (A for masters, B&Y for young chess players and amateurs, and C&D–E for amateurs), rapid chess tournament (G) and two blitz tournaments (F and H). The eleventh festival in 2022 was held in Ķīpsala and included five classical chess tournaments (A for masters, B, C, D for amateurs and Y for young chess players), rapid chess tournament (F) and two blitz tournaments (E and G).

List of A tournament winners 
{| class="sortable wikitable"
! Year !! Winner !! 2nd place !! 3rd place !! Best woman
|-
| 2011
|  
|  
|  
|  
|-
| 2012
|   
|  
|  
|  
|-
| 2013
|   
|   
|  
|  
|-
| 2014
|   
|   
|  
|  
|-
| 2015
|   
|   
|  
|  
|-
| 2016
|   
|   
|   
|  
|-
| 2017
|   
|   
|  
|  
|-
| 2018
|   
|   
|  
|  
|-
| 2019
|   
|   
|  
|  
|-
| 2021
|   
|  
|  
|  
|-
| 2022
|   
|  
|  
|  
|}

References

External links
  Riga Technical University Open home page
  Riga Technical University Open 2011
  Riga Technical University Open 2012
  Riga Technical University Open 2013
  Riga Technical University Open 2014
  Riga Technical University Open 2015
  Riga Technical University Open 2016
  Riga Technical University Open 2017
  Riga Technical University Open 2018
  Riga Technical University Open 2019
  Riga Technical University Open 2021
  Riga Technical University Open 2022

Sports competitions in Riga
Chess competitions
Chess in Latvia
Riga Technical University
Summer events in Latvia